Kasenga is a town in  Kasenga territory of Haut-Katanga province of the Democratic Republic of the Congo.

References

Populated places in Haut-Katanga Province